Hans Krag (born 14 December 1904 in Christiania, died 27 January 1984 in Søgne) was a Norwegian writer, publisher and translator, known i.a. for his works on heraldry. His works include the book Norsk heraldisk mønstring fra Frederik IV's regjeringstid 1699–1730, with Norwegian arms from the reign of Frederick IV, and articles in Heraldisk Tidsskrift. He was the first Norwegian member of L'Académie Internationale d'Héraldique. He also published works on genealogy.

References
 Obituary by Harald Nissen in Heraldisk Tidsskrift no. 51, Copenhagen, March 1985, p. 38.

1904 births
1984 deaths
20th-century Norwegian writers
20th-century Norwegian male writers